Franz Isenegger is a Swiss bobsledder who competed in the early 1980s. He won two medals in the four-man event at the FIBT World Championships with a silver in 1981 and a bronze in 1982.

References
Bobsleigh four-man world championship medalists since 1930

Living people
Swiss male bobsledders
Year of birth missing (living people)
20th-century Swiss people